The Canfranc Underground Laboratory (LSC) is a world-class deep underground laboratory designed for research in neutrino physics, dark matter and other unusual phenomena in nature that require very low environmental radioactivity to be observed. The location of the LSC, 800 meters below ground, is excavated between the Somport road tunnel and the old railway tunnel, about 8 km long, on the Spain-France border. Today, the LSC is the second largest laboratory in Europe at great depth, in close collaboration with the most important underground laboratories in the international framework: LNGS (Italy), SNOLab (Canada) and Kamioka (Japan).

The LSC is a Consortium formed by a Consortium between the Spanish Ministry of Science and Innovation, the Government of Aragon and the University of Zaragoza which belongs to the national network of Singular Scientific and Technical Infrastructures (ICTS).

History 
In the mid-1980s, with the intention of locating an underground laboratory where nuclear and astroparticle physics experiments could be carried out, the Nuclear Physics and High Energies group of the University of Zaragoza, led by Ángel Morales, examined the site of the Canfranc disused railroad tunnel. It was a site without any infrastructure except for the existence of two small chambers, of barely 10 m2 each, located 780 meters from the Spanish entrance of the tunnel at a depth of 675 meters water equivalent (m.w.e). In 1986, the two rooms that would later become Laboratory 1 were fitted out. In 1989 the first experiment of the laboratory (called bb-gamma) was set up in the west chamber: it was an experiment to search for the double beta decay of 76Ge in order to study the nature and mass of the neutrino.

In 1991, a new 27 m2 prefabricated module was installed on the train tracks. This module, together with the existing one, was placed in a new location at 1200 meters from the Spanish entrance (at a depth of 1380 m.w.e.); this location was conditioned (electrical network, telephone, ventilation, etc.) which constituted Laboratory 2. In this period the Zaragoza group took an important step at international level by co-leading the IGEX collaboration. This involved the search for the neutrinoless double beta decay of 76Ge using hyper-pure germanium detectors isotopically enriched to 86% in 76Ge. The PNNL, USC, INR, as well as the Institute for Theoretical and Experimental Physics (ITEP, Russia) and the Yerevan Physical Institute (Armenia) participated in the project.

In 1994, during the construction of the Somport road tunnel, the General Management of Roads of the State Secretariat of Infrastructures and Transport of the Ministry of Transport carried out, at its own expense, the excavation and adaptation works of a new 118 m2 laboratory at 2520 meters from the Spanish entrance and at a depth of 2450 m.w.e. In this new facility, called Laboratory 3, which was operational at the beginning of 1995, the Phase 2 of IGEX was installed, consisting of three detectors of 2 kg of active mass each in a low background shielding consisting of 40 cm of lead, a PVC box (sealed with silicone) through which nitrogen gas circulates, 2 mm of cadmium, 40 cm of polyethylene and an active veto of plastic scintillators.

The experimental results obtained during these years placed the Canfranc Laboratory at the forefront of research in the field of nuclear and astroparticle physics. This was essential for the competent bodies to approve an extension of the laboratory that would allow a new qualitative leap: the current Canfranc Underground Laboratory.

Now 
The LSC is a multidisciplinary ICTS, with a surface area of 1,600 m2 and a volume of 10,000 m3 in the underground laboratory equipped with an outstanding number of facilities. The main underground infrastructure, called LAB2400, is divided into Hall A, the largest experimental area with 600 m2 , Hall B and C and a service area. The rest of the annexed underground infrastructures are called LAB2500 and LAB780 respectively, according to their distance to the Spanish entrance of the railway tunnel.

At the LSC, 22 national and international collaborations, with more than 260 scientists and engineers from 50 institutions, carry out their research at the frontier between astroparticle physics, geodynamics and biology.

References

External links 

 LSC Webpage

Underground laboratories
Research institutes in Spain
Laboratories in Spain